Euphorbia margalidiana is a species of flowering plant in the spurge family Euphorbiaceae, endemic to the Balearic Islands, where its natural habitats are Mediterranean Matorral shrubland vegetation and rocky shores. It is particularly valued in cultivation for its tolerance of a wide range of conditions, including drought. Though hardy down to  it grows best in mild areas.

Like all euphorbias, it produces an irritant milky sap when cut or broken. All parts of the plant are toxic when ingested.

It has gained the Royal Horticultural Society’s Award of Garden Merit.

References

margalidiana
Endemic flora of Spain
Matorral shrubland
Critically endangered plants
Flora of the Balearic Islands
Taxonomy articles created by Polbot